This is a list of hammer throwers.

A

B
 Tatyana Beloborodova

C
 Libor Charfreitag

D
 Lance Deal

E
 Bronwyn Eagles
 Markus Esser

F
 Paweł Fajdek

G
 Tibor Gécsek

H
 Ralf Haber
 Betty Heidler
 Martina Hrasnova

K
 Olli-Pekka Karjalainen
 Karsten Kobs
 Ilya Konovalov
 Primož Kozmus
 Olga Kuzenkova
 Zdzisław Kwaśny

L
 Sergey Litvinov (born 1958)
 Sergey Litvinov (born 1986)

M
 Eiichiro Matsuno
 Lukáš Melich
 Mihaela Melinte
 Lisa Misipeka
 Manuela Montebrun
 Yipsi Moreno
 Koji Murofushi

N
 Dilshod Nazarov
 Zsolt Németh
 Wojciech Nowicki

P
 Krisztián Pars
 Vladyslav Piskunov
 DeAnna Price

S
 Yuriy Sedykh
 Vasiliy Sidorenko
 Andriy Skvaruk

T
 Jüri Tamm
 Alexandra Tavernier
 Ivan Tsikhan

W
 Heinz Weis
 Zhang Wenxiu
 Anita Włodarczyk

Z
 Aleksey Zagornyi
 Szymon Ziółkowski

See also
 

 List
Hammer throwers